Rural sports may refer to:

 List of rural sports and games
Rural Sports, 1713 book by John Gay
Rural Sports, 1801 book by William Barker Daniel